Orcines is a commune in the Puy-de-Dôme department in Auvergne in central France. Located at the foot of the Chaine des Puys, Orcines is an important village for the hikers who come visiting the natural heritage in Auvergne. The town belongs to the rural area of Clermont-Ferrand.

Geography

Apart from Orcines proper, the commune also includes fifteen villages : Ternant, Sarcenat, La Fontaine du Berger, Chez Vasson, Le Gressigny, Solagnat, La Baraque, Villars, La Font de l'Arbre, Montrodeix, where the small river Tiretaine originates, Enval, Le Cheix, Bonnabry, Bellevue et Fontanas, one of the most sizeable.

Population

People 
 Rev. Pierre Teilhard de Chardin, S.J.
The population in this village is relatively older than the average in France (see French article).

See also 
 Communes of the Puy-de-Dôme department

References

External links 

 Official Website (in French)

Communes of Puy-de-Dôme